The 2017 season of the Tamil Nadu Premier League was the second edition of the TNPL, a professional Twenty20 cricket league in Tamil Nadu, India. The league was formed by the Tamil Nadu Cricket Association (TNCA) in 2016.

Teams

Source:

Tournament Results

Points Table
  advanced to the playoffs

Source:Cricbuzz

Playoffs

References

Tamil Nadu Premier League
2017 in Indian cricket
Cricket in Tamil Nadu